Thomas Jefferson Boynton (December 30, 1856 – April 14, 1945) was a U.S. political figure who served in 1882 as a member of the Vermont legislature, the city solicitor and the Mayor of Everett, Massachusetts and as the Massachusetts Attorney General.
 
Boynton was born in Westfield, Vermont.

1917 Massachusetts Constitutional Convention
In 1916 the Massachusetts legislature and electorate approved a calling of a Constitutional Convention. In  May 1917, Boynton was elected to serve as a member of the Massachusetts Constitutional Convention of 1917, representing the Twentieth Middlesex District of the Massachusetts House of Representatives.

Notes

External links

1856 births
1945 deaths
People from Orleans County, Vermont
Members of the Vermont House of Representatives
Members of the 1917 Massachusetts Constitutional Convention
Massachusetts Attorneys General
Mayors of Everett, Massachusetts
Massachusetts lawyers
United States Attorneys for the District of Massachusetts